Matsumoto Pond is a pond south of Dais Col and  west of Don Juan Pond in South Fork, Wright Valley, Victoria Land, Antarctica. It was named by the Advisory Committee on Antarctic Names (1997) after Japanese chemist Genki I. Matsumoto, who was a member of four Japanese Antarctic Research Expedition field parties (1976–77, 1981–82, 1983–84, 1985–86) that made geophysical and geochemical studies of ponds in the McMurdo Dry Valleys, including investigation of this feature.

References

Lakes of Victoria Land
McMurdo Dry Valleys